Éric Dazé (born July 2, 1975) is a Canadian former professional ice hockey winger who played for the Chicago Blackhawks of the National Hockey League for eleven seasons.

Playing career 
Eric Daze began his career playing midget with Laval in Quebec AAA Midget Hockey League. In the 1992–93, he joined the Hull Olympiques of the Quebec Major Junior Hockey League (QMJHL) before being traded to the Beauport Harfangs late in the season. Despite starring for Beauport, and a strong junior career (finishing with 261 points in 191 games), Daze's value amongst NHL scouts dropped sharply due to his unwillingness to play a rough game, despite possessing the abilities for it.

Daze was drafted in the fourth round, 90th overall, in the 1993 NHL Entry Draft by the Chicago Blackhawks (with the draft pick the Blackhawks received with Stephane Beauregard for Dominik Hasek). He had early success and was named to the NHL All-Rookie Team in 1996 after scoring 30 goals as a rookie. He scored at least 20 goals in each season between 1996 and 2003, even when struggling with injuries, and was named to the NHL All-Star Game in 2002. Daze who was appearing in his first All-Star Game, was named game MVP (two goals/one assist), becoming the first Blackhawk player to win the award since Bobby Hull in 1971. He often polarized Chicago fans because he showed a reluctance to involve himself in the physical (hitting) aspect of the game despite his prototypical power forward build. Instead he displayed a combination of size and good scoring ability, especially during key, or clutch, moments of the game. He possessed a quick wrist shot and an excellence with one-timers.

Unfortunately, Daze ran into severe back problems during his career, which limited him to only 19 games in the 2003–04 NHL season. Even after three herniated disc surgeries in a five-year span, pain was still a problem in Daze's back when he attempted to return to the Blackhawks in 2005. He quietly left professional hockey after appearing in only the season opener that year. On March 20, 2010, Daze officially announced his retirement on the Comcast Sportsnet pregame show before the Blackhawks game.

Personal life 
Daze is married to Guylaine, whom he met during his high school years. The couple have two children and the family resides in Hinsdale, Illinois.

Awards 
1994 — QMJHL First All-Star Team
1995 — QMJHL First All-Star Team
1995 — QMJHL Frank J. Selke Memorial Trophy (Most Gentlemanly Player)
1995 — CHL Sportsman of the Year Award
1996 — NHL All-Rookie Team
2002 — Played in NHL All-Star Game
2002 — NHL All-Star Game MVP

Career statistics

Regular season and playoffs

International

See also
List of NHL players who spent their entire career with one franchise

References

External links 

Eric Dazé biography at The Hockey Writers

1975 births
Living people
Beauport Harfangs players
Canadian ice hockey forwards
Chicago Blackhawks draft picks
Chicago Blackhawks players
Hull Olympiques players
Ice hockey people from Montreal
National Hockey League All-Stars